Music Universe K-909, also known as K-909 is a South Korean music program presented by BoA, with K-pop professor Jaejae and K-pop assistant Haewon (Nmixx).

Music Universe K-909 is a show features appearances of popular k-pop acts and "newcomers", who perform live on stage and interact with the audience throughout each episode. It airs every Saturday at 16:40 KST on JTBC, starting from September 24, 2022.

Synopsis
It is a show that contains "the infinite expansion of K-pop, which is a world-leading 'music to be seen" that is completed with visual concepts and performances through first publicly released songs, special collaboration stages, and documentary videos containing the artist's diverse world of music. BoA, who started as a music program MC after 20 years of debut, shares a deep and meaningful connection with artists as a musician colleague and a senior who has been at the top for a long time.

Segments
 Next Generation: This segment introduces future artist who have "the potential to lead the next generation of K-pop" every week on the stage. It highlight newcomers or lesser-known artists.
 Global Chart Forum: This is a segment presented by Jaejae and Haewon of Nmixx where they will analyze 'Global K-pop Chart', which aggregates the worldwide K-pop music and album sales in depth and take charge of the corner dealing with K-pop trends by setting a new topic each time. The segment also will show their deep K-pop knowledge in a quiz showdown prepared ambitiously by the production team of 'K-pop Over-immersion' and answered the high-level questions accurately.
 First Stage Performance: This is a segment where artist performed their new released song for the first time on stage.
 Global Collaboration Stage: This is a segment where various domestic and foreign artists joined for a special collaboration stage.

Episodes

Performances
 – First stage performance
 – Exclusive stage performance
 – 4K on air
 – 4K + exclusive stage or first stage performance

Episode 1 was broadcast on September 24, 2022.

Episode 2 was broadcast on October 1, 2022.

Episode 3 was broadcast on October 8, 2022.

Episode 4 was broadcast on October 15, 2022.

Episode 5 was broadcast on October 22, 2022.

Episode 6 was broadcast on October 29, 2022.

Episode 7 was broadcast on November 12, 2022.

Episode 8 was broadcast on November 19, 2022.

Episode 9 was broadcast on November 26, 2022.

Episode 10 was broadcast on December 3, 2022.

Episode 11 was broadcast on December 10, 2022.

Non-Korean performances

Global Chart Forum

Similar programs 
Mnet M Countdown
SBS Inkigayo
KBS Music Bank
MBC Show! Music Core
Arirang TV Pops in Seoul
Arirang TV Simply K-Pop (formerly called The M-Wave and Wave K)
JTBC Music on Top
MBC M Show Champion
SBS M The Show

See also
Music programs of South Korea

Notes

References

External links
  
 
 

2022 South Korean television series debuts
Korean-language television shows
South Korean reality television series
South Korean music television shows
South Korean variety television shows
JTBC original programming
K-pop television series